Ayinde is a Yoruba name common in Nigeria. It means “we give praises when he came”. Notable people with the name include:

 Ayinde Augustus, United States Virgin Islands soccer player
 Ayinde Bakare, Nigerian musician
 Ayinde Barrister, Nigerian musician 
 Ayinde Jamiu Lawal, Nigerian footballer
 Ayinde Ubaka, American basketball player

References 

Nigerian names